Jesús Reza Rosales (born January 15, 1951) is a Mexican Luchador, or professional wrestler, best known under the ring name Mano Negra. Mano Negra is Spanish for "The Black Hand" and is taken from the Spanish anarchist organisation La Mano Negra. Rosales is a former two time holder of the NWA World Welterweight Championship, two time holder of the NWA World Light Heavyweight Championship, and the Mexican National Light Heavyweight Championship while working for Empresa Mexicana de Lucha Libre (EMLL). He also worked for the Universal Wrestling Association (UWA) where he held the UWA World Junior Light Heavyweight Championship and for the World Wrestling Association (WWA) where he held the WWA Lightweight Championship. Mano Negra was originally an Enmascarado, or masked wrestler, but lost a Lucha de Apuesta, bet match, to Atlantis in the main event of CMLL's 60th Anniversary Show and was forced to unmask.

Professional wrestling career
Jesús Rosales trained under world-renowned Lucha libre trainer Diablo Velazco as well as his father, Luchador El Rebelde as well as Rafael Salamanca and Rolando Vera before making his professional wrestling debut in 1971. Upon his debut he adopted the ring name Mano Negra ("The Black Hand") and was inspired by the Spanish anarchist organization La Mano Negra. Rosales adopted a black mask with blue trim, a black and blue outfit and a black glove for his "black hand". On December 14, 1973, just three years after his debut he won the NWA World Welterweight Championship by defeating Karloff Lagarde in the finals of an Empresa Mexicana de Lucha Libre (EMLL) held tournament for the vacant title. Mano Negra held the title for 562 days, regularly defending it on EMLL's main shows in Arena México, before losing the championship to Blue Demon on June 29, 1975. It would take over a year before Mano Negra was able to regain the championship, pinning Fishman for the championship on November 19, 1976. His second reign with the welterweight title lasted for 892 days in total, one of the longest reigns in the history of the title, ending on April 30, 1979, when he lost to Américo Rocca. In the early 1980s Mano Negra moved from the Welterweight division (with an upper limit of ) to the Light Heavyweight division (with an upper limit of ) when he defeated Babe Face to win the Mexican National Light Heavyweight Championship on July 30, 1983. The reign lasted exactly 400 days before Valente Férnandez won the title from him on September 2, 1984. The following year Mano Negra won the Universal Wrestling Association's UWA World Junior Light Heavyweight Championship, defeating Negro Navarro for the championship. The following year Mano Negra began a long-term storyline feud with El Cobarde II, a feud that saw Cobarde II win the UWA World Junior Light Heavyweight Championship from Mano Negra in late 1985, but saw Mano Negra gain the ultimate measure of revenge when he defeated El Cobarde II in a Lucha de Apuesta, mask vs. mask match on August 10, 1986 and forced Cobarde II to unmask after the match.

In the early 1990s, Mano Negra's career saw a resurgence as he began a feud with the very popular Atlantis. The storyline started out with Mano Negra defeating Atlantis for the NWA World Middleweight Championship on March 3, 1993. Mano Negra was in turn defeated by Oro only two months later, but regained the middleweight title on July 3, 1993. In September 1993, at CMLL's 60th Anniversary Show, Atlantis and Mano Negra faced off in the main event of the evening with both wrestlers putting their mask on the line in a Lucha de Apuesta match. After three highly competitive falls, Atlantis defeated Mano Negra. After the match Mano Negra was unmasked for the first time and had to reveal that his real name was Jesús Reza Rosales, which is traditional after a Lucha de Apuesta loss. On December 7, 1993 Mano Negra's last title run came to an end when he lost to Corazón de León. Mano Negra worked for CMLLuntil around 1996 when he began working on the Mexican independent circuit. In 2009 he made a series of appearances for International Wrestling Revolution Group (IWRG).

Personal life
Jesús Rosales is the son of Luchador El Rebelde and two of his sons and a daughter are in turn also Luchadors. His oldest son competed using the ring name "Mano Negra Jr.", wearing a mask that is very similar to the mask his father used to wear. His youngest son works under the name "El Hijo de Mano Negra" ("The Son of Mano Negra"), while his daughter competes under the name Sanely. One of Rosales' daughters is married to Black Warrior and the mother of Warrior Jr.

Championships and accomplishments
Empresa Mexicana de Lucha Libre
Mexican National Light Heavyweight Championship (1 time)
NWA World Middleweight Championship (2 times)
NWA World Welterweight Championship (2 times)
Universal Wrestling Association
UWA World Junior Heavyweight Championship (1 time)
World Wrestling Association
WWA Lightweight Championship (1 time)

Luchas de Apuestas record

Notes

References

1951 births
Living people
Mexican male professional wrestlers
Sportspeople from Torreón
Professional wrestlers from Coahuila
NWA World Middleweight Champions
20th-century professional wrestlers
21st-century professional wrestlers
NWA World Welterweight Champions
UWA World Junior Light Heavyweight Champions
Mexican National Light Heavyweight Champions